The National, currently referred to as the Boost National for sponsorship reasons, is curling tournament that is one of the six events that are part of the Grand Slam of Curling tour, and one of its four "majors".

Beginning in 2022, the event features 16 men's and 16 women's teams. The top 15 teams on the World Curling Federation's Order of Merit qualify, plus a "sponsors exemption". The 16 teams are divided into four groups of four teams, and the top eight teams overall advance to a single elimination playoff. In 2021, the event was a 16 team triple knockout event before the 8 team playoff. From 2015 to 2019, the event had 15 teams divided into three groups of five teams.  From 2007 to 2014, the event had three pools of six teams each.

Past champions

Men
 
*Maxime Elmaleh curled for the team in the final.

Women

References

 
Men's Grand Slam (curling) events
Women's Grand Slam (curling) events
Annual sporting events in Canada
Recurring sporting events established in 2002
2002 establishments in Canada